Tyrone Cash is a fictional character in the Ultimate Marvel universe. He is a member of The Ultimates and is described as being the first Hulk before Bruce Banner became the Hulk.

Publication history
Tyrone Cash first appeared in Ultimate Comics: Avengers Vol. 2 #7 and was created by Mark Millar and Leinil Francis Yu.

Fictional character biography
In the Ultimate Marvel universe, Dr. Leonard Williams was a professor at Cambridge University and a family man with a wife and children. Due to a disability, he relied on the aid of crutches to walk. Cambridge is where he worked with a young Bruce Banner. They worked together in order to create a Super-Soldier Formula. During this time, he became Bruce's "mentor" and allegedly taught Banner "everything he knows." Williams disappears in an unexplained occurrence in which several people are killed, and comes to be considered a missing person.

Leonard Williams became the first Hulk and lives as "Tyrone Cash." Unlike the Bruce Banner's Hulk, Tyrone Cash still retains his intellect and self-control and takes a pill containing the modified Hulk Serum as one of its ingredients. The years he was "missing," he was actually being monitored by S.H.I.E.L.D., while he was "murdering and pillaging his way through Africa and Asia." Now 16 years after the accident Leonard Williams "perished" in, Tyrone Cash resides in South America living as a ruthless gang leader. In order to draft Williams/Cash into the Avengers black ops team, General Nick Fury sends War Machine to retrieve him. War Machine approaches Cash peacefully, and tries to remind him of his previous life, but Cash turns on him, and starts brutally beating War Machine. During their fight, Cash shows how powerful he is and how truly sadistic and ruthless he has become. He plucks a one-man plane from the air and uses it as a weapon, with no remorse for killing the pilot or the others on his island. He threatens to quickly rebuild his "crime empire" if War Machine ruins it. Cash only stops fighting after War Machine says "We'll tell your wife and kid you're still alive."

The first assignment given to Cash and his fellow Avengers is to take out the enigmatic and deadly Ghost Rider. In an attempt to "get the jump on" Ghost Rider the Avengers and S.H.I.E.L.D. agents stand guard at an airport. Ghost Rider eventually arrives to capture, and inevitably kill, his target. Ghost Rider ripped a man from his plane and quickly rides off, but his escape is cut short by a well placed rocket courtesy of Hawkeye.

Tyrone Cash is discovered to be behind the sale of S.H.I.E.L.D.-owned Super-Soldiers on the black market. After the Avengers attempt to take him down and arrest him, he confesses that he was secretly taking orders from Carol Danvers and that she has been selling S.H.I.E.L.D. secrets for years. He is taken down by Blade, who hypnotizes him and drains his Hulk Serum out of him. Upon being brought to the S.H.I.E.L.D. Helicarrier, Tyrone Cash tells Nick Fury the secrets of the Hulk Serum and is then killed by Nick Fury.

Powers and abilities
Using a pill that contains a perfected version of his Hulk Serum, Tyrone Cash has immense strength, stamina, durability, and speed, as well as regenerative capabilities, which are similar to those from the Hulk. Cash also has shown to be a very skilled scientist.

Other versions
During the Secret Wars storyline, an alternate version of Leonard Williams appears as a member of the Thor Corps on Battleworld. He is seen with Thor versions of Gamora, Kit Renner, and other unknown Thor Corps members where they pin down the Banshee Squadron when they landed upon leaving Hala Field in their aircraft.

References

Ultimate Marvel characters
Comics characters introduced in 2010
Characters created by Mark Millar
Marvel Comics characters with accelerated healing
Marvel Comics characters with superhuman strength
Marvel Comics characters who can move at superhuman speeds
Marvel Comics mutates
Marvel Comics scientists
Fictional characters from parallel universes
Fictional characters with superhuman durability or invulnerability
Fictional Black British people
Fictional murderers
Fictional gangsters
Fictional mass murderers
Fictional University of Cambridge people